Abu Rummaneh is an upscale neighborhood and district of the Muhajirin municipality in western Damascus, Syria. It had a population of 6,421 in the 2004 census.

References

Neighborhoods of Damascus